Constitutional colorblindness is an aspect of United States Supreme Court case evaluation that began with Justice Harlan's dissent in Plessy v. Ferguson in 1896.  Prior to this (and for several years afterwards), the Supreme Court considered skin color as a determining factor in many landmark cases. Constitutional colorblindness holds that skin color or race is virtually never a legitimate ground for legal or political distinctions, and thus, any law that is "color-conscious" is presumptively unconstitutional regardless of whether its intent is to subordinate a group, or remedy racial discrimination. The concept, therefore, has been brought to bear both against vestiges of Jim Crow oppression, as well as remedial efforts aimed at overcoming such discrimination, such as affirmative action.

Color Blindness 
The theory behind racial color blindness is that a person should have unlimited opportunities regardless of race. There is a big contemporary debate surrounding affirmative action; some believe that it is beneficial because a person's social class should be considered instead of their race.  Others criticize color blindness because,“There are concerns that majority groups use color-blindness as a means of avoiding the discussion of racism and discrimination." This might diminish the hardships that minorities face in the public eye. Another thought that emerges from this concept is that, "color-blindness operates under the assumption that we are living in a world that is "post-race", where race no longer matters."

Plessy v. Ferguson (1896) 
The Plessy v. Ferguson case is an example of how the Supreme Court was not colorblind in their decision which upheld the "separate but equal" doctrine that allowed segregation. While reviewing the case, the Supreme Court looked solely at the race of Plessy and decided that the railroad had every right to arrest him. The Supreme Court would then approve all laws that enforced racial segregation. Justice Harlan was the only person on the case who dissented and responded that the '"arbitrary separation of citizens on the basis of race"' was equivalent to imposing a '''badge of servitude"' on African Americans. He contended that the real intent of the law was not to provide equal accommodations but to compel African Americans to keep to themselves. This was intolerable because "our Constitution is color-blind, and neither knows nor tolerates classes among citizens."

In his dissent, Justice Harlan wrote, "The white race deems itself to be the dominant race in this country.  And so it is, in prestige, in achievements, in education, in wealth, and in power.  So, I doubt not, it will continue to be for all time, if it remains true to its great heritage and holds fast to the principles of constitutional liberty.  But in the view of the Constitution, in the eye of the law, there is in this country no superior, dominant, ruling class of citizens.  There is no caste here.  Our Constitution in color-blind and neither knows nor tolerates classes among citizens.  In respect of civil rights, all citizens are equal before the law.   The humblest is the peer of the most powerful.  The law regards man as man and takes no account of his surroundings or of his color when his civil rights as guaranteed by the supreme law of the land are involved..."

Jim Crow 
The Jim Crow era was a time period where places in the South were legally allowed to segregate businesses and various other locations based upon race. Jim Crow law, in U.S. history, any of the laws that enforced racial segregation in the South between the end of Reconstruction in 1877 and the beginning of the civil rights movement in the 1950s. The Supreme Court didn't object to segregation, but instead made it legal under the" separate but equal" law. Jim Crow, in fact created separate facilities that were highly unequal. Among the inequality, educational institutions for African Americans weren't well funded. In addition to the eradication of civil and political rights, Jim Crow also prevented blacks from bettering themselves economically. Many African Americans were forced to work and if they didn't, they were threatened with being arrested for vagrancy, the act of being unemployed and homeless.

Brown v. Board of Education of Topeka (1954) 
The Brown v. Board of Education was a turning point in the civil rights era and was a series of laws that worked to overturn segregation. This case was intended to allow black students to attend white schools. The plaintiffs explained that by being racially separated, black people were treated poorly and that the "separate but equal" doctrine didn't uphold in their favor because the services and accommodations they received were low quality. The Court unanimously decided in Brown that laws separating children by race in different schools violated the Equal Protection Clause of the Fourteenth Amendment to the United States Constitution, which provides that "[n]o state shall … deny to any person … the equal protection of the laws." In making its decision, the Court declared that "separate educational facilities are inherently unequal." The decision in this case influenced the overturning of segregation in other cases that were dealing with separation on buses, trains, and many public places.

Affirmative Action 
Affirmative action is an act, policy, plan, or program designed to remedy the negative effects of wrongful discrimination. "Affirmative action" can remedy the perceived injustice of discrimination on the basis of a person's race, national origin, ethnicity, language, sex, religion, disability, sexual orientation, or affiliation. Also known as "positive discrimination", affirmative action originated with Executive Order 10925 signed by John F. Kennedy in 1961 requiring federal government contractors to "take affirmative action to ensure that applicants are employed and that employees are treated during employment without regard to their race, creed, color, or national origin."  As a civil rights policy affecting African Americans, "affirmative action" most often denotes race-conscious and result-oriented efforts undertaken by private entities and government officials to correct the unequal distribution of economic opportunity and education that many attribute to slavery, segregation, poverty, and racism.

Arguments against affirmative action 

 Affirmative action is reverse discrimination. The past discrimination against certain minority groups does not justify present discrimination against non-minorities. All people are equal under the laws of the United States of America and should be treated accordingly.
 It destroys the idea of a meritocracy and instead puts race as the dominant factor in admissions and hiring procedures. The best people for the position should be put there, regardless of race.
 Students/workers who are put into a position through affirmative action often are not fully ready for the task. Not only is this not good for the university/company, but it is also not good for these students/workers as well because it lowers self-esteem.
 Affirmative action reinforces stereotypes and racism because of the previous point. People given a position purely because of affirmative action often are not qualified, and the idea that all people of that race must be "stupid" is perpetuated. Also, it presupposes that all people of the same skin color are from the lower class, and therefore need help. This also reinforces stereotypes and even embeds them permanently into the system.
 Simply having people of different races or ethnicity in the workplace/university does not necessarily mean diversity of opinion. People with the same skin color are not necessarily the same in opinion or even culture.

References

African-American history between emancipation and the civil rights movement
History of African-American civil rights